Timateo Benard Agele Michael (born 4 December 1992), or simply known as Bernard Agele, is a South Sudanese international  footballer who plays for Bruneian club Kota Ranger FC of the Brunei Super League
and the South Sudan national team as a defender.

Career
Agele has played for various clubs such as Villa Uganda, Kampala City, Express,   Victoria University,  KCB in Kenya,  Villa, and  played for UiTM  in Malaysia.

In January 2019, Agele joined UiTM F.C. on a 10-month contract.

The following year, Agele signed for Kota Ranger FC, a club based in Brunei.

National Team
Agele made his debut for  South Sudan national team on 23 November 2015 against  Djibouti during the CECAFA 2015 Tournament. South Sudan national team won 2–0.

Statistics accurate as of match played 17 November 2019

Honors

Express
Ugandan Super League: 1
 2012

Victoria University
 Ugandan Cup winner: 2013
 Ugandan Super Cup runner-up: 2013

References

External links
 
 

1992 births
Living people
People from Arua District
People with acquired South Sudanese citizenship
South Sudanese footballers
South Sudan international footballers
Ugandan footballers
Ugandan people of South Sudanese descent
Association football defenders